Pizza Connection is a 1985 Italian crime film directed by Damiano Damiani. It was entered into the 35th Berlin International Film Festival where it won an Honourable Mention. A version of the film dubbed for the USA was titled The Sicilian Connection, a name already held by another film from 1972.

Cast
 Michele Placido as Mario Aloia
 Mark Chase as Michele Aloia
 Ida Di Benedetto
 Nick Delon
 Luigi Maria Burruano
 Piergiorgio Capone
 Pierluigi Capone
 Simona Cavallari as Cecilia Smedile
 Massimo De Francovich
 Maria Denaro
 Domenico Gennaro
 Massimo Liti
 Leondina Marchese
 Leonardo Marino

Awards
 Nastro d'Argento: Silver Ribbon award for best actor (Michele Placido)
 David di Donatello: David award  for  best music  (Carlo Savina)
 Berlin Film Festival: Honourable Mention

References

External links

1985 films
1980s crime films
Italian crime drama films
1980s Italian-language films
Films directed by Damiano Damiani
Films scored by Carlo Savina
1980s Italian films